The Uganda Episcopal Conference (UEC) or Episcopal Conference of Uganda is the local conference of Roman Catholic bishops in Uganda, established in 1960.

The UEC acts primarily through the Uganda Catholic Secretariat in an effort to promote and coordinate social and pastoral ministry of the Catholic Church of Uganda. This task is performed through twelve committees including the liturgical-pastoral, dedicated to the apostolate of the laity, the Board of justice and peace, as education and training of priests, and those on ecumenism and interreligious dialogue. The statutes of the Conference were approved by the Holy See on September 8, 1974.

The UEC is a member of the Association of Member Episcopal Conferences in Eastern Africa (AMECEA) and Symposium of Episcopal Conferences of Africa and Madagascar (SECAM).

Presidents of the Bishops' Conference

1969–1975: Emmanuel Kiwanuka Nsubuga, archbishop of Kampala

1975–1977: John Baptist Kakubi, Archbishop of Mbarara

1977–1982: Adrian Kivumbi Ddungu, Bishop of Masaka

1982–1986: Barnabas R. Halem 'Imana, Bishop of Kabale

1986–1994: Emmanuel Wamala, Bishop of Mityana - Kiyinda and Archbishop of Kampala

1994–2002: Paul Lokiru Kalanda, Bishop of Fort Portal

2002–2006: Paul K. Bakyenga, Archbishop of Mbarara

2006–2010: Matthias Ssekamaanya, bishop of Lugazi

2010–2018: John Baptist Odama, Archbishop of Gulu

2018 to date: Rt. Rev. Joseph Anthony Zziwa, Bishop of Kiyinda-Mityana

References

External links
 Official website
 "Catholic Church in Republic of Uganda", GCatholic.org
 "Catholic Church in Uganda", Catholic-Hierarchy

Uganda
Catholic Church in Uganda

it:Chiesa cattolica in Uganda#Conferenza_episcopale